This was the first edition of the tournament.

Sachia Vickery won the title after defeating Jamie Loeb 6–1, 6–2 in the final.

Seeds

Draw

Finals

Top half

Bottom half

References
Main Draw

Central Coast Pro Tennis Open - Singles